François III de Longueville (1535–1551) was the eldest son of Louis II d'Orléans, Duke of Longueville and Marie de Guise. He succeeded his father, who died on 9 June 1537, to the duchy of Longueville.

Life
François was born on 30 October 1535 His mother, Marie de Guise, was from the powerful French Catholic House of Guise. His father, Louis, was the son of Louis I d'Orleans, Duke of Longueville. 

Following his father's death and his mother's marriage to James V of Scotland, François' care was entrusted to his grandmother, Antoinette de Bourbon. Francis kept correspondence with his mother, sending her a piece of string to show how tall he was, and later his portrait. 

By 1550 François was ill. His mother had returned to France as part of the betrothal of his half-sister Mary to Francis, Dauphin of France. She tended him through what would be his final illness. François died shortly before his mother returned to Scotland.

References

Sources

Wood, Marguerite, ed., Balcarres Papers, vol. 1, SHS (1923), 110 from Joinville, 145 from Fontainebleau.

External list 
 Liste des ducs de Longueville

Dukes of Longueville
1535 births
1551 deaths